The Blackstone Apartments or Fuxing Apartments are the first purpose-built luxury apartments for expatriates in Shanghai, China. Built in 1924, the four-storey building is created from imported concrete and stones from the UK, giving it a dark appearance.

The Blackstone Apartments is a protected historic apartment building in the former French Concession area of Shanghai. It was completed in 1924. The building was the first purpose-built apartment building for expatriates in this location.

Location
The building is located in the centre of Fuxing Middle Road (formerly Route LaFayette), on the corner with Fenyang Road, in Shanghai's Xuhui District. It is in the central part of the former French Concession area of the city.

Architecture
Completed in 1924, the six-storey building is the oldest Baroque apartment building in Shanghai. Using imported British concrete with the use of black stones, the symmetrical facade has a large ornamental awning at the front with Double Corinthian Columns.
The building originally had a large garden and communal swimming pool in the building.

History
The building served as private residences up until after World War II, when it was converted into the office for the United Nations Relief and Rehabilitation Administration. A previous tenant from 1946 to 1947, Betty Barr Wang, describes the building as follows:

See also
 List of historic buildings in Shanghai

References

1924 establishments in China
Residential buildings completed in 1924
Apartment buildings in China
Buildings and structures in Shanghai